Nora Veryán (1929–1998) was a Mexican film actress. She was married to Mexican film actor Raúl Meraz but later separated. The couple had one son together.

Selected filmography
 A Family Like Many Others (1949)
 We Maids (1951)
 It Happened in Mexico (1958)
 Santa Claus (1959)
 His First Love (1960)
 Adventures of Joselito and Tom Thumb (1960)
 La pantera de monte escondido (1962)
Imperio de cristal (1994-1995)

References

Bibliography 
 Rogelio Agrasánchez. Guillermo Calles: A Biography of the Actor and Mexican Cinema Pioneer. McFarland, 2010.

External links 
 

1929 births
1998 deaths
Mexican film actresses
People from Guadalajara, Jalisco